In 2023, tropical cyclones formed in seven major bodies of water, commonly known as tropical cyclone basins. So far 23 systems formed with 11 of them being named. Throughout 2023, three major tropical cyclones formed, including two Category 5 tropical cyclones Saffir–Simpson scale (SSHWS) during the year.

Tropical cyclones are primarily monitored by ten warning centers across the world, designated as a Regional Specialized Meteorological Center (RSMC) or a Tropical Cyclone Warning Center (TCWC) by the World Meteorological Organization (WMO). These ten centers are the National Hurricane Center (NHC), the Central Pacific Hurricane Center (CPHC), the Japan Meteorological Agency (JMA), the Indian Meteorological Department (IMD), Météo-France (MFR), Indonesia's Badan Meteorologi, Klimatologi, dan Geofisika, the Australian Bureau of Meteorology (BoM), Papua New Guinea's National Weather Service, the Fiji Meteorological Service (FMS), and New Zealand's MetService. Other notable warning centers include the Philippine Atmospheric, Geophysical and Astronomical Services Administration (PAGASA; albeit official within the Philippines), the United States's Joint Typhoon Warning Center (JTWC), and the Brazilian Navy Hydrographic Center.

Global atmospheric and hydrological conditions 
There is an amplified Madden-Julian Oscillation 
(MJO) event over the Eastern Indian Ocean present and is contributing to instability and an increase in conductive environment for increased convective activity in the area.
On February 9, the NOAA made a new ENSO forecast stating that the La Nina is still ongoing but will transition into an ENSO-Neutral soon. It says that there is around a 5% chance that the La Nina persists throughout March and around a 95% chance of an ENSO-Neutral in March. The ENSO-Neutral is expected to transition into a El Nino later in the year with around a 60% chance of an El Nino in September.

Summary

Western Pacific Ocean

The season began on March 4 with the formation of a tropical depression that formed near the equator.

North Indian Ocean

The season began on January 30 with the formation of a tropical depression classified as BOB 01 over the Bay of Bengal. The storm's formation makes it the first time since 2019 to see a storm develop in the month of January in the basin. The JTWC later issued a TCFA on the system, which it designated as Invest 90B. It began to weaken after continued land interaction with Sri Lanka.

South-West Indian Ocean

January - June

On January 17, a zone of Disturbed Weather classified as 05 formed northeast of Madagascar. It was later upgraded to Tropical Depression by the MFR and  the JTWC. Meteo Madagascar later named it Cheneso. After making landfall in northeastern Madagascar, the JTWC issued their final warning. The MFR, however, was still tracking the system, and stated that Cheneso had become an overland depression. On January 21, the JTWC began re-issuing advisories, as the system had re-emerged over water, and later re-issued a TCFA on the system. The MFR re-designated the system as Tropical Disturbance Cheneso. The JTWC re-upgraded the system to tropical storm status, and on January 24, the MFR, upgraded it to a moderate tropical storm. It was later upgraded to tropical cyclone (MFR designation) and category-1 hurricane (JTWC designation). With land interaction and upwelling cool waters, it degenerated into a severe tropical storm (MFR designation) on January 27 as it started accelerating towards the south. It was later downgraded to tropical storm by the JTWC. After briefly re-intensifying to tropical cyclone status, it was downgraded to strong tropical storm and transitioned into a Post-tropical depression on January 29. By January 30, JTWC issued the last warning for Cheneso. On February 9, Tropical Low 11U from the Australian region moved into the Southwest Indian Ocean basin, which the MFR classified as Moderate Tropical Storm Dingani. The JTWC initiated advisories as Tropical Cyclone 13S. It was struggling to intensify due to high wind shear, however was later upgraded to Severe Tropical Storm. It was later upgraded to Tropical Cyclone status by the MFR and Category 1 Hurricane by the JTWC. After reaching Catgeory 2 status, it turned southward, and after weakening, it transitioned into a post-tropical depression on February 15. On February 14, Severe Tropical Cyclone Freddy entered this basin, where it was immediately designated as a Tropical Cyclone by the MFR. It later intensified into Intense Tropical Cyclone on the MFR's scale, and re-intensified into a Category 5 major hurricane on the SSHWS, becoming the first category 5 cyclone of the year. After weakening, it later re-intensified, reaching Very Intense Tropical Cyclone status on the MFR's scale. On February 21, it weakened and made landfall in Madagascar, and emerged into the Mozambique Channel. It re-intensified to Severe Tropical Storm status and February 24, made its second landfall in Mozambique. On February 22, a Tropical Depression formed, which later intensified into a Moderate Tropical Storm, hence gaining the name Enala. The system eventually intensified to Tropical Cyclone status before steadily weakening as it was heading southwards. Freddy, meanwhile, re-emerged into the Mozambique Channel on March 2, where it eventually intensified to Tropical Cyclone status.

Australian Region

January - June

The season began with Cyclone Ellie, which persisted into 2023. Ellie dissipated on January 8, ending its long duration over the Australian mainland. On January 6, Tropical Low 07U formed over the Coral Sea, becoming the first storm to form in the basin. 07U entered the South Pacific basin on the next day, where it was named Hale by the FMS. Tropical Disturbance 05F formed on January 14 by the FMS, while it was still in the Australian basin. It briefly moved into the South Pacific basin and re-entered into the Australian basin. It later moved back into the South Pacific Basin. On January 18, a tropical low formed. The JTWC issued a TCFA on the system as it crossed into the South Pacific basin. It was later identified as 06F (10P from JTWC) and was dissipated on January 21 with vertical wind shear in South Pacific Ocean. On January 22, a tropical low classified as 10U by the BoM formed from a monsoon trough over the Arafura Sea, which generally headed westward after formation. It dissipated on January 26. On January 27, the BoM noted that a tropical low formed in the central Indian Ocean and classified it as 11U. The JTWC designated the system as Invest 94S, and began to consolidate. Another tropical low formed in the central Indian Ocean being classified as 12U by the BoM and Invest 95S by the JTWC, which dissipated on February 5. The same day, another tropical low classified as 13U by the BoM and 97S by the JTWC formed northeast of 12U, and began to consolidate. 13U intensified into a Category 1 tropical cyclone, henceforth being assigned the name Freddy. Tropical Low 14U formed south of the Solomon Islands, also being tracked by the JTWC, by the code identfier 99P. Freddy intensified into a Category 3 on the Australian scale, and 14U became the fifth named storm of 2023 as it became a Category 1 on the Australian scale, henceforth being assigned the name Gabrielle. Tropical Low 11U moved into the Southwest Indian Ocean basin on February 9, where it was assigned the name Dingani. Freddy weakened into a category two tropical cyclone before intensifying again. Gabrielle moved into the South Pacific basin as a Category 3 severe tropical cyclone on February 10. Freddy intensified into a Category 4 on both the Australian scale and the SSHWS. Tropical Low 15U formed in the Gulf of Carpentaria on February 11. Freddy, after weakening slightly, moved into the South-west Indian Ocean basin on February 14. 15U was last noted on February 17. On February 23, the BoM reported that 16U had formed to the north of the coast of Pilbara, later moving into the Gulf of Carpentaria before moving inland. 17U, a weak tropical low, formed over land to the south of the Joseph Bonaparte Gulf on February 24. Another weak tropical low formed on February 26, classified as 18U by the BoM. It moved into the South Pacific basin on March 1. 17U, meanwhile, was last noted on February 27.

South Pacific Ocean

January - June

On January 5, a tropical disturbance which was designated as 03F formed near New Caledonia, becoming the first system to form in 2023. 03F dissipated two days later as it was in close proximity with nearby Cyclone Hale. On January 7, Tropical Low 07U entered the basin from the Australian region, where it was reclassified as 04F. On the same day, the system strengthened into a Category 1 cyclone and was named Hale by the FMS. Hale struggled to intensify further due to moderate wind shear and became an extratropical cyclone as it approached New Zealand. Hale caused widespread flooding and slips in the northern and eastern parts of the country however, no fatalities were reported. Tropical Disturbance 05F formed on January 14 by the FMS, while it was still in the Australian basin. It briefly moved into the South Pacific basin and re-entered into the Australian basin. It later moved back into the South Pacific basin. After re-entering into the basin, the JTWC had upgraded the system to Cyclone 09P, and the FMS named the system Irene, as the system had reached tropical storm intensity. It began subtropical transition and completed it on January 19, in which the JTWC issued their final warning on the system. The tropical low that had formed in the Australian region on January 18 crossed over into the South Pacific basin, where the JTWC kept up its TCFA on the system. The FMS classified the system as Tropical Depression 06F. The system dissipated on January 22 without any impacts to land. Severe Tropical Cyclone Gabrielle moved into the South Pacific basin on February 10. It reached peak intensity in this basin as a Category 3 on the Australian scale, and later made landfall on Norfolk Island as a Category 2, and subsequently became subtropical, prompting the BoM and the JTWC to cease advisories, however the JTWC was still tracking it as Subtropical Storm 12P. However, it eventually became fully extratropical and the JTWC stopped tracking the system. Tropical Disturbance 08F formed just south of Samoa on February 23. It later intensified into a Category 1 Tropical Cyclone, hence being assigned the name Judy. It later intensified into a Category 4 severe Tropical Cyclone. On March 5 it weakened into a Extatropical Cyclone. On February 27 the Bureau of Meteorology (BoM) had started tracking Tropical Low 18U on the Australian Region then it entered the South Pacific Basin where it intensified into a Category 1 Tropical Cyclone given the name Kevin. It rapidly intensified in to a Category 5 Tropical Cyclone just south-east of Vanuatu. It weakened to an extratropical cyclone on March 5. Both Judy and Kevin were major tropical cyclones when they struck Vanuatu only 48 hours apart from each other. Tropical Disturbance 10F formed on March 9 near Niue. On March 11, 11F formed to the west of Tonga, with 12F forming a bit after to the northeast of Vanuatu.

South Atlantic Ocean 

Without affecting any area and moving away from the Brazilian coast, it lost its subtropical characteristics in the afternoon of 10 January, according to the Brazilian Navy Hydrography Center.

Mediterranean Sea
Two systems formed in the Mediterranean Sea in early 2023. On January 21, Storm Hannelore transitioned into a Mediterranean tropical-like cyclone in the Adriatic Sea. The storm travelled west-northwest and made landfall in the Rimini Province, Italy early on January 22. Hannelore transitioned into an extratropical cyclone soon after landfall and no impacts from the system was reported. In February, Storm Helios briefly transitioned into a Mediterranean tropical-like cyclone to the south of Sicily and brought record-breaking rain to Malta.

Systems

January

January was active, featuring eleven systems with five of them being named. From 2022, Cyclone Ellie from the Australian region persisted into 2023. The first storm of the year started off with a short lived disturbance classified as 03F, which formed in the South Pacific basin. Shortly after 03F, a tropical low classified as 07U formed in the Australian basin and later entered the South Pacific basin. There, 07U strengthened into a tropical cyclone and was named Hale by the FMS; becoming the first named storm of the year. The northern part of New Zealand suffered minor flooding after Hale's remnants made landfall over the country on January 10, and one indirect fatality was reported. Four days later, Irene formed, becoming the second named storm in the basin. Irene passed near New Caledonia and Vanuatu however, no serious damage was reported. Moreover in the Australian and South Pacific basins, four tropical lows classified as 06F, 10U, 11U, and 12U formed.  The remnants of 06F contributed to major flooding in New Zealand which caused 4 fatalities. In the South-West Indian Ocean basin, Cyclone Cheneso formed south of Diego Garcia and made landfall over northern Madagascar. After landfall, Cheneso's remnants reorganized in the Mozambique Channel and intensified into a Category 2 cyclone, becoming the strongest storm of the month. Cheneso devastated much of the country and destroyed many infrastructures due to its slow movement off the coast while reorganizing. As of January 31, 33 fatalities were reported from the cyclone. The Northern Indian Ocean basin had an early start with a depression classified as BOB 01 forming on January 30. In the South Atlantic, a subtropical depression formed off the coast of Brazil. The depression however, moved away from the coast and weakened. 11U moved into the Southwest Indian Ocean basin on February 9, where it was assigned the name Dingani. It later intensified to Tropical Cyclone on the MFR's scale and Category 1 on the SSHWS. It eventually intensified to Tropical Cyclone status before turning southward and eventually transitioning into a post-tropical depression. The Mediterranean Sea featured Cyclone Hannelore, a short-lived system in the Adriatic Sea.

February

February was slightly active, featuring ten systems with six of them being named. The month also includes an unofficial cyclone named Helios which formed in the Mediterranean Sea. The month started off with Freddy, which formed in the Australian Region on February 4. Freddy reached its peak intensity as a Category 4-equivalent cyclone before crossing into the South-West Indian Ocean basin. There, the MFR immediately classified Freddy as an intense tropical cyclone. The cyclone further intensified into a Category 5-equivalent tropical cyclone, becoming the first one of the year. Freddy continued travelling across the Indian Ocean before making landfall over Madagascar and Mozambique, killing at least 100 people. Unexpectedly, Freddy emerged back over the Mozambique Channel and restrengthed back into a cyclone. The cyclone then made its second landfall over Mozambique. Freddy became the longest-lived tropical cyclone on record and was also the first cyclone since Leon–Eline and Hudah in 2000 to travel across the entire Southern Indian Ocean. On February 6, Cyclone Gabrielle formed in the Australian Region. As Gabrielle headed towards New Zealand, the cyclone reached its peak intensity as a Category 3 cyclone. Gabrielle caused extensive damage across New Zealand and other nearby countries. Gabrielle became the costliest tropical cyclone on record in the Southern Hemisphere. Additionally, the cyclone was the deadliest in New Zealand since 1968. Cyclone Enala formed on February 19 in the Southern Indian Ocean and reached its peak as a Category 1-equivalent cyclone. However, Enala had no affect on land. Judy and Kevin both formed in the South Pacific basin and intensified into major cyclones. The two cyclones later impacted Vanuatu. Four other weak tropical lows also formed in the Australian Region. Most were short lived and were no threat to land. Additionally, Cyclone Helios in the Mediterranean Sea brought record-breaking rainfall on Malta.

March

The month started off with a tropical depression forming to the east of Singapore in the West Pacific basin on March 4.

Global effects
There are a total of nine tropical cyclone basins, seven are seasonal and two are non-seasonal, thus all seven basins except the Mediterranean and South Atlantic are active. In this table, data from all these basins are added.

See also 

 Tropical cyclones by year
 List of earthquakes in 2023
 Tornadoes in 2023
 Weather of 2023

Notes

References

External links 

 
Tropical cyclones by year